Magilla may refer to:

Magilla Gorilla, a Hanna-Barbera cartoon character
The Magilla Gorilla Show, a Hanna-Barbera cartoon featuring the character
Magilla (comics), a Marvel Comics character

See also
Megillah (disambiguation)